Gustavo Raskosky Páez (born in 1913) was a Nicaraguan politician and former Vice President. 

He was elected Mayor of Managua in 1954 and was replaced in 1961. During his administration the National Urbanism Office was created to regulate and control the urban growth of Managua. 

He served as Vice President of Nicaragua from May 1963 to May 1967

References

Vice presidents of Nicaragua
Nationalist Liberal Party politicians
Mayors of Managua
1913 births

Year of death missing
20th-century Nicaraguan politicians